SZTAKI Desktop Grid (SzDG) was a BOINC project located in Hungary run by the Computer and Automation Research Institute (SZTAKI) of the Hungarian Academy of Sciences. It closed on June 21, 2018.

SZTAKI Desktop Grid was initiated in early 2005 and had its public launch on 26 May 2005. The aim of the initiative was to help the Public Resource Computing model to spread via the BOINC platform in Hungary.  In 2005 the level of participation in BOINC among volunteers in Hungary was very low, but the main problem was that there wasn’t any Hungary-based, open project that would use volunteer computing. The Laboratory of Parallel and Distributed Computing of the Institute created SzDG as the first public Hungarian desktop grid. It is open to host distributed research applications for any research institute in Hungary or around the world.

Local SZTAKI Desktop Grid 

During the setup of SzDG the staff of the laboratory identified the security problems with BOINC that render the idea of Public Research Computing undesirable among enterprise communities. To overcome these security issues (e.g. companies unwilling to let any information be sent out to public domains) the laboratory is offering a freely available local package of the BOINC software. Wrapped in a Debian package, it only requires a single computer with the Debian operating system to create a desktop grid server in a local environment.

Scientific Research 

SzDG is an online architecture, run by the Laboratory of Parallel and Distributed Systems. The staff of the laboratory maintains the system, which is open for any scientific research (see the section on DC-API to get an idea of the characteristics of suitable applications) seeking immense computing power. SzDG currently hosts one mathematical project.

BinSYS Project 
Project BinSYS was established by the Department of Computer Algebra of Eötvös Loránd University was to find generalized binary number systems up to dimension 11.

The program finds binary number systems and outputs a list of characteristic polynomials that are likely to be number system bases. The list is processed by another program and the final result is then a complete list of binary number systems in a fixed dimension.

In beta phase, the project started by investigating the 10th dimension, which entailed the processing of ninety thousand matrices, of which a total of 383 pieces seemed to be worthy of further inspection.

The DC-API 

The Distributed Computing API (DC-API) was created by the laboratory to help the developers of distributed applications to overcome the difficulties of program development. The API hides the idiosyncrasies of BOINC, allowing developers to focus on their own research tasks. The API comes prepacked in a Debian package, available freely from the official website indicated below.

The DC-API allows integration with applications on several grid environments.

BOINC infrastructure 
Using the Berkeley Open Infrastructure for Network Computing (BOINC) volunteer computing platform.
 The current science application version is 2.06.
 At this time there is no screen saver.
 Work unit CPU times vary widely: some work units can be very fast (10 minutes) and some can be very slow (75 hours).
 Most work units will take about 45 minutes.
 Work units are around [100kb ... 135kb] each, averaging around 120kb.
 You have to run many work units to get levels of credit comparable to SETI or Climate Prediction distributed programs.

References

External links
Official Website
Project Homepage
BinSYS Project Homepage
Homepage of the Laboratory of Parallel and Distributed Computing
What is a generalized binary number system?
SZTAKI Project stats

Science in society
Free science software
Volunteer computing projects
Cross-platform free software